Lynx issiodorensis, sometimes called the Issoire lynx, is an extinct species of lynx that inhabited Europe during the late Pliocene to Pleistocene epochs, and may have originated in Africa during the late Pliocene. It is named after the town of Issoire where the first remains were found. It probably became extinct during the end of the last glacial period.

It is generally considered as the ancestor of all four species of lynx alive today. Its skeleton resembled that of living lynxes, but it had shorter and more robust limbs, with a larger head and longer neck. As a result, the Issoire lynx more closely resembled a typical member of the cat family than do its extant descendants.

In 1945, another lynx species, Lynx shansius, was described based on fossils from Asia. However, in 1984 a reexamination of the L. shansius material determined it to be synonymous with L. issiodorensis.

References

issiodorensis
Fossil taxa described in 1828
Pliocene carnivorans
Pleistocene carnivorans
Prehistoric felines
Quaternary mammals of Europe